William Stuart Baring-Gould (1913–10 Aug 1967) was a noted Sherlock Holmes scholar, best known as the author of the influential 1962 fictional biography, Sherlock Holmes of Baker Street: A Life of the World's First Consulting Detective.

Biography

He was the son of William Drake Baring-Gould (1878–1921), a grandson of Sabine Baring-Gould and a descendant of John Baring. 

He married Lucile "Ceil" Marguerite Moody in 1937.

He was creative director of Time magazine's circulation and corporate education departments from 1937 until his death.

Writing
In 1955, Baring-Gould privately published The Chronological Holmes, an attempt to lay out, in chronological order, all the events alluded to in the Sherlock Holmes stories. Three years later, Baring-Gould wrote The Annotated Mother Goose: Nursery Rhymes Old and New, Arranged and Explained, with his wife, Lucile "Ceil" Baring-Gould. The book provides a wealth of information about nursery rhymes, and includes often-banned bawdy rhymes.

In 1967, Baring-Gould published The Annotated Sherlock Holmes, an annotated edition of the Sherlock Holmes canon.

Baring-Gould also wrote The Lure of the Limerick a study of the history and allure of limericks; it included a collection of limericks, arranged alphabetically, and a bibliography; and Nero Wolfe of West Thirty-fifth Street: The life and times of America's largest private detective, a fictional biography of Rex Stout's detective character Nero Wolfe; in this book, Baring-Gould popularised the theory that Wolfe was the son of Sherlock Holmes and Irene Adler. The two books were published posthumously, in 1968 and 1969, respectively.

Major works
 The Chronological Holmes, 1955 (with revisions from an earlier edition that appeared in The Baker Street Journal in 1948)
 Sherlock Holmes of Baker Street, 1962
 The Annotated Sherlock Holmes, 1967
 The Lure of the Limerick, Panther Books, London, 1968
 Nero Wolfe of West Thirty-Fifth Street, 1969

References

1913 births
1967 deaths
Sherlock Holmes scholars
20th-century English non-fiction writers
20th-century English male writers
English male non-fiction writers
William S.
Time (magazine) people